Ghost fleet or Ghost Fleet may refer to:
Ghost fleet, an unofficial expression for a reserve fleet
National Defense Reserve Fleet 
Ghost Fleet (novel) by P. W. Singer and August Cole
Ghost Fleet of Mallows Bay, a reference to the sunken ships in Mallows Bay after World War I
Ghost Fleet of Truk Lagoon, a fleet of sunken warships in Chuuk Lagoon during World War II